Maria Joana Chiappetta (born July 27, 1986) is a Brazilian actress.

On December 17, 2017, she won the fourteenth season of Dança dos Famosos, the Brazilian version of Dancing with the Stars.

Career

Filmography

References

External links
 

1986 births
Living people
Actresses from Rio de Janeiro (city)
Brazilian film actresses
Brazilian stage actresses
Brazilian television actresses
21st-century Brazilian actresses
Dancing with the Stars winners